Camira Creek is a locality between the towns of Casino and Grafton in northern New South Wales, Australia. The North Coast railway passes through, and a railway station was provided between 1935 and 1974. Work to ease tight curves in the rail alignment commenced just north of the locality in 2011.

References

Towns in New South Wales
Northern Rivers
Richmond Valley Council